"Love Is Reason" is a song by Norwegian new wave band A-ha. It was released as a single in 1985 in Norway and the Philippines from their debut album Hunting High and Low. In the UK, it was released as the B-side of "Take On Me".

References

1985 singles
A-ha songs
Songs written by Paul Waaktaar-Savoy
Warner Records singles
1985 songs
Songs written by Magne Furuholmen